Chawalit Kamutchati (born 6 March 1937) is a Thai former sports shooter. He competed in the 50 metre rifle, three positions event at the 1972 Summer Olympics.

References

1937 births
Living people
Chawalit Kamutchati
Chawalit Kamutchati
Shooters at the 1970 Asian Games
Shooters at the 1972 Summer Olympics
Shooters at the 1974 Asian Games
Place of birth missing (living people)
Asian Games medalists in shooting
Chawalit Kamutchati
Chawalit Kamutchati
Chawalit Kamutchati
Medalists at the 1970 Asian Games
Medalists at the 1974 Asian Games
Chawalit Kamutchati